The 1999 Porsche Tennis Grand Prix doubles was the tennis doubles event at the 1999 Porsche Tennis Grand Prix, the twenty-second edition of the most prestigious tournament in Baden-Württemberg. Lindsay Davenport and Natasha Zvereva were the defending champions, but they did not compete this year. Davenport competed with Martina Hingis as the first seed, while Zvereva competed with Elena Tatarkova. Davenport and Hingis withdrew in the quarterfinals due to Davenport having a wrist injury, whilst Tatarkova and Zvereva were knocked out in the first round.

US Open finalists Chanda Rubin and Sandrine Testud won the title, defeating third seeds Arantxa Sánchez Vicario and Larisa Neiland.

Seeds

Draw

Qualifying

Seeds

Qualifiers
  Květa Hrdličková /  Barbara Rittner

Qualifying draw

References
 ITF singles results page

Doubles
Porsche Tennis Grand Prix - Doubles